Kingussie Camanachd is a shinty team from Kingussie, Scotland and according to the Guinness Book of Records 2005, is world sport's most successful sporting team of all time, winning 20 consecutive leagues and going 4 years unbeaten at one stage in the early 1990s.  The club are current holders of the Camanachd Cup, the MacAulay Cup and the MacTavish Cup.

History 

The club was founded in 1893.  It won the first ever Camanachd Cup in 1896 and the club has won the cup more times than any other team, apart from Newtonmore. However, despite early success in the competition for much of the twentieth century the club struggled to win the trophy, with a victory in 1961 the club's first in forty years.

The senior team once held a 63-game unbeaten record and the junior team achieved 100 games unbeaten in the early 90s. That unprecedented domination of the sport  led to them becoming the World's most successful sporting team. In 1991, the club was forced to play one season at Dunbarry, as the Dell was under repair.

Between 1996 and 2004, they only lost two games at the Dell. Both of these were against Newtonmore. Lochcarron became the first team to bring this run to an end when the beat them 7–4. All the more surprising as Kingussie had thrashed them 10–3 a couple of weeks previously.

In defeating Fort William in the 2003 Camanachd Cup final, Ronald Ross drove home the point about the club's total dominance of the sport, "Is there a team out there that can beat us? Well, I don't think so. We did not play all that well, but we destroyed them."

The Club's world record of domination in sport was finally brought to an end on 2 September 2006 when old rivals Newtonmore defeated Oban Camanachd.  This meant that Kingussie could not catch the team at the top of the league.

Fort William won the league in 2006 but Kingussie gained a modicum of revenge by defeating Fort in the 2006 Camanachd Cup Final.

In 2007, they signed Fraser Inglis from Oban Camanachd who helped Kingussie regain the league again, the club also won the MacAulay Cup in 2007 against Inveraray.

The most notable Kingussie player of recent times has been Ronald Ross who has achieved iconic status in the game.  Another notable player is Kevin Thain who is the second highest scorer in the history of the sport, although his total is around half that of Ross'. The other notable name linked with the club is that of Borthwick. the five sons of Alistair 'Alta' Borthwick, were the backbone of the great 90s team.

The club are now working closely with Newtonmore to help revitalise the grassroots game in the area, whose poor state has been masked by the continued success of the Kingussie senior side.

Jimmy Gow returned as manager for the third time in 2008.  Although the club lost in the Camanchd Cup Final to Fort William, they had a 100% record in the league.

The 2009 season has been a tumultuous season for Kingussie, they were defeated in the finals of the MacTavish Cup and Macaulay Cup by last minute goals and were knocked out of the Camanachd Cup at the semi-final stage after a replay of a game which was abandoned with Kingussie leading 4–1 against Kyles Athletic.  They also lost to Glenurquhart in the Clash of the Camans final.

With the league undecided, Gow announced his intention to stand down at the end of the 2009 season with Stevie Borthwick taking on the role of manager in 2010. Kingussie eventually clinched their 24th league title in 25 years on 5 December by defeating Kyles Athletic.  This saw them overhaul Newtonmore on goal difference.

The start of the 2010 season saw Borthwick attempt to blood youngsters.  Ronald Ross suffered a freak injury tripping on a tennis ball whilst coaching youth shinty, the team lost the first game of the season for the first time in living memory and then suffered a poor 6–0 defeat to Fort William Shinty Club. Kingussie have been written off several times before and have always comeback, but 2010 promised to be the most testing season in many years for the club. The club did well after a rocky start to the season and defeated Kilmallie to win the MacTavish Cup and were in contention for the league until a couple of games to go. The Macaulay Cup was also added to the honours for the season and with a win in the semi-final of the Camanachd Cup, Kingussie was the only team which could achieve the grand slam as of 31 August 2010. The club was sponsored by npower for 2010. However the club lost to local rivals Newtonmore 6–0 in the league which extinguished its league hopes (and ultimately gave its closest rivals its first league title in 25 years) and was beaten 3–2 in the Camanachd Cup Final.  This was a fine return for a season of rebuilding.

In 2010, the club started up a new website which also had a vote for the greatest XII in the club's history.  The club also purchased the Dell from Dochfour Estate, from whom it had leased the park for 100 years previous.

Steven Borthwick was confirmed as manager for 2011 alongside Ronald Ross as captain at the club's 2010 AGM. The club had a reasonably successful 2011 winning the MacTavish Cup and reaching the Camanachd Cup Final but in Kingussie terms, this was a disappointing return.  The second team also won the Sutherland Cup. Borthwick stood down at the end of 2011.

Russell Jones was appointed manager for the 2012 season.

2014 saw the club lift the Camanachd Cup for the first time since 2006 and Ronald Ross announced his retirement from first team duties after the victory over Glenurquhart at the Bught Park.  However, in 2015 Kingussie would face a great decline, the club ending in the play-off position of ninth. They faced a relegation play-off with National Division One runners-up Kilmallie, which they won 2–0.

Dallas Young was appointed manager for 2017.

Since 2019, Kingussie have been resurgent. They won the Premiership in 2019 along with the MacAulay Cup. They retained the MacAulay Cup in 2021 whilst also winning Senior League B, a regional league played due to COVID-19 restrictions. In 2022 they are on course to win the Grand Slam having won all three major cups and having a strong lead in the league.

References

External links
Kingussie Shinty Club homepage

Sports clubs established in 1893
Shinty teams
Sport in Highland (council area)
1893 establishments in Scotland
Kingussie